Saint Bertrand or Saint Bertram may refer to:

Saint Bertechramnus (d. 623), bishop of Le Mans
Saint Bertrand of Comminges (d. 1123), bishop
Blessed Bertrand of Grandselve (d. 1149), abbot of Grandselve Abbey
Blessed  (d. 1230), companion of Saint Dominic
Blessed Bertrand of Saint-Geniès (d. 1350), patriarch of Aquileia

See also
Saint-Bertrand-de-Comminges